Sławki  is a village in the administrative district of Gmina Somonino, within Kartuzy County, Pomeranian Voivodeship, in northern Poland. It is located in the ethnocultural region of Kashubia in the historic region of Pomerania.

The village has a population of 412.

History
During the German occupation of Poland (World War II), in 1939, some Poles from Sławki were among the victims of a massacre committed by the Germans in nearby Kaliska as part of the genocidal Intelligenzaktion campaign.

Transport
There is a railway station in the village.

References

Villages in Kartuzy County